A formulary is a list of pharmaceutical drugs, often decided upon by a group of people, for various reasons such as insurance coverage or use at a medical facility. Traditionally, a formulary contained a collection of formulas for the compounding and testing of medication (a resource closer to what would be referred to as a pharmacopoeia today). Today, the main function of a prescription formulary is to specify particular medications that are approved to be prescribed at a particular hospital, in a particular health system, or under a particular health insurance policy. The development of prescription formularies is based on evaluations of efficacy, safety, and cost-effectiveness of drugs.

Depending on the individual formulary, it may also contain additional clinical information, such as side effects, contraindications, and doses.

By the turn of the millennium, 156 countries had national or provincial essential medicines lists and 135 countries had national treatment.

Australia
In Australia, where there is a public health care system, medications are subsidised under the Pharmaceutical Benefits Scheme (PBS) and medications that are available under the PBS and the indications for which they can be obtained under said scheme can be found in at least two places, the PBS webpage and the Australian Medicines Handbook.

United States

In the US, where a system of quasi-private healthcare is in place, a formulary is a list of prescription drugs available to enrollees, and a tiered formulary provides financial incentives for patients to select lower-cost drugs. For example, under a 3-tier formulary, the first tier typically includes generic drugs with the lowest cost sharing (e.g., 10% coinsurance), the second includes preferred brand-name drugs with higher cost sharing (e.g., 25%), and the third includes non-preferred brand-name drugs with the highest cost-sharing (e.g., 40%).

When used appropriately, formularies can help manage drug costs imposed on the insurance policy. However, for drugs that are not on formulary, patients must pay a larger percentage of the cost of the drug, sometimes 100%. Formularies vary between drug plans and differ in the breadth of drugs covered and costs of co-pay and premiums. Most formularies cover at least one drug in each drug class, and encourage generic substitution (also known as a preferred drug list). Formularies have shown to cause issues in hospitals when patients are discharged when not aligned with outpatient drug insurance plans.

United Kingdom
In the UK, the National Health Service (NHS) provides publicly funded universal health care, financed by national health insurance. Here, formularies exist to specify which drugs are available on the NHS. The two main reference sources providing this information are the British National Formulary (BNF) and the Drug Tariff. There is a section in the Drug Tariff, known unofficially as the "Blacklist", detailing medicines which are not to be prescribed under the NHS and must be paid for privately by the patient. Recommendations for additions to the NHS formulary are provided by the National Institute for Health and Care Excellence.

In addition to this, local NHS hospital trusts and Primary Care (General Practitioners) Clinical Commissioning Groups (CCGs), produce their own lists of medicines deemed preferable for prescribing within their locality or organisation; such lists are usually a subset of the more comprehensive BNF. These formularies are not absolutely binding, and physicians may prescribe a non-formulary medicine if they consider it necessary and justifiable. Often, these local formularies are shared between a Primary Care Organisation (PCO) and hospitals within that PCO's jurisdiction, in order to facilitate the procedure of transferring a patient from primary care to secondary care, thus causing fewer "interfacing" issues in the process.

As in the United States, the NHS actively encourages prescribing of generic drugs, in order to save more of the budget allocated to them by the Department of Health.

National formulary
A national formulary contains a list of medicines that are approved for prescription throughout the country, indicating which products are interchangeable. It includes key information on the composition, description, selection, prescribing, dispensing and administration of medicines. Those drugs considered less suitable for prescribing are clearly identified.

Examples of national formularies are:
 Australian Pharmaceutical Formulary (APF)
 Österreichisches Arzneibuch (ÖAB), the Austrian national formulary
 British National Formulary (BNF) and British National Formulary for Children (BNFC)
 Farmacotherapeutisch Kompas (FK), the Dutch national formulary
 Formularium Nasional (Fornas), the Indonesian national formulary
 Hrvatska Farmakopeja, the Croatian national formulary
 Japan National Health Insurance Drug Price List
 Pharmaceutical Schedule, New Zealand's publicly funded national formulary
 United States National Formulary, later bought out and merged with the United States Pharmacopeia (USP-NF)
 Farmaceutiska Specialiteter i Sverige (FASS), the Swedish national formulary. Usage of the database is free of charge and it has no promotional texts or advertising. FASS has been developed by the Swedish Association of the Pharmaceutical Industry (LIF) in close cooperation with Sweden's pharmaceutical industry, with additional assistance from the Medical Products Agency, the Pharmaceutical Benefits Board and the National Corporation of Pharmacies. Information on interactions is derived from a joint development between the Departmentof Pharmaceutical Biosciences at Uppsala University and the Swedish Association of the Pharmaceutical Industry (LIF).

See also

References

External links
 A National Formulary for Canada, Department of Economics, University of Calgary, 2005 (archived 6 July 2011)
 The Kazakhstan National Formulary (archived 27 March 2022)

Pharmacy
Pharmaceuticals policy
Pharmacological classification systems
Medical terminology
Health care management
Health care quality
Health economics